Tohlezkus is a genus of plate-thigh beetles in the family Eucinetidae. There are at least three described species in Tohlezkus.

Species
These three species belong to the genus Tohlezkus:
 Tohlezkus inexpectus Vit, 1995
 Tohlezkus orientalis Vit, 1981
 Tohlezkus ponticus Vít, 1977

References

Further reading

 

Scirtoidea
Articles created by Qbugbot